This is a list of cricketers who have played matches for the Water and Power Development Authority cricket team.

Players
 Aamer Sajjad 2004/05-2015/16
 Afzal 1977/78
 Ali Raza
 Amjad Siddique
 Aqeel Ahmed
 Arshad Iqbal
 Asif Ali
 Atiq-ur-Rehman
 Ayaz Tasawwar
 Bilal Khilji
 Farrukh Raza
 Haafiz Shahid Yaqoob 1984–1987
 Hafiz Saad Nasim 2009/10–2012/13
 Hasnain Shah
 Iftikhar Malik
 Majid Habib
 Iftikhar-ul-Haq 1977-78
 Ikramullah Sheikh 2000/2001–2001/2002
 Imran Ali
 Imran Nazir
 Mohammad Imran Tahir 1998–1999 2004–2007
 Javed Hayat
 Javed Ismail 1998
 Kashif Raza 1999/00
 Khalid Usman 2018-19
 Majid Habib 1977/78
 Maqsood-ul-Haq
 Mesome Hussain
 Mohammad Akram Raza 1984-1985 
 Mohammad Ali
 Mohammad Asif
 Mohammad Ayub
 Mohammad Azharullah
 Mohammad Imran Khan
 Mohammad Irfan, Jr. 2014-
 Mohammad Kamran Hussain 2000/01–2001/02
 Mohammad Junaid Khan
 Mohammad Mohsin
 Mohammad Saad
 Mohammad Saleem Mughal
 Mohammad Yousuf
 Muhammad Hassan Adnan Syed
 Mushtaq Ahmed
 Najeeb Amar 
 Naseer Ahmed, one appearance in Patron's Trophy competition of 1977/78
 Naseer Akram
 Obaidullah Sarwar
 Rafatullah Mohmand 2000/01-2014/15
 Rana Naved-ul-Hasan 2001-2015
 Saeed Ajmal
 Saeed Anwar
 Sajjad Akbar
 Salman Butt
 Shabbir Ahmed Khan
 Shakeel Khan
 Shoaib Khan
 Shujauddin 1977
 Sohaib Maqsood 2013
 Sohaibullah 2016-17
 Shoaib Nasir
 Syed Inzamam-ul-Haq 2006-07 /Umar rafiq 2010-11
 Umaid Asif
 Waqar Malik
 Waqas Maqsood
 Wasim Haider
 Zaheer Khan
 Zahid Mansoor
 Zulfiqar Babar

References 

Lists of Pakistani cricketers